Cedent may refer to:

 In law, the party transferring a personal claim in the act called cession.
 A Latin term in Civil Law referring to the "assignor" in Assignment (law)
 In logic, the antecedent and succedent of a sequent in sequent calculus are called cedents.
 In insurance, a reinsured.